Jennifer "Gemma" Jones (born 4 December 1942) is an English actress. Appearing on both stage and screen, her film appearances include Sense and Sensibility (1995), the Bridget Jones series (2001–2016), the Harry Potter series (2002–2011), You Will Meet a Tall Dark Stranger (2010), and Ammonite (2020).

For her role in the BBC television film Marvellous (2014), she won the 2015 BAFTA TV Award for Best Supporting Actress. Her other roles on television include Rainbow City (1967), The Duchess of Duke Street (1976–1977), Trial and Retribution (2003–2008), Spooks (2007–2008), Teacup Travels (2015–2017), Diana and I (2017), and Gentleman Jack (2019).

Early life
Jones was born in Marylebone, the daughter of Irene (née Isaac; 1911–1985) and Griffith Jones, an actor (1909–2007). Her brother Nicholas Jones is also an actor. She attended the Royal Academy of Dramatic Art, where she won the gold medal.

Career
During the 1960's Gemma Jones performed with companies at regional theatres including the Nottingham Playhouse, Birmingham Repertory Theatre and the Little Theatre, Bristol. In 1962 she appeared at the Mermaid Theatre as Gilda in the original stage production of Alfie. In the 1970's Jones performed in productions with the National Theatre at the Old Vic and with the Royal Shakespeare Company as  Hippolyta/Titania. Jones made many further performances in classical and contemporary plays with the RSC in the 1980's and 1990's, including appearances in separate productions of The Winters Tale as both Hermione (1981) and a decade later as Paulina (1993). In 1986, she played the soprano Giuseppina Strepponi in After Aida at the Old Vic Theatre. 

On television Jones became known to viewers after starring in the BBC serial Kenilworth (1967) as Queen Elizabeth I, and in BBC 2's 1970 dramatisation of The Spoils of Poynton.

She was first recognised outside the UK in the mid-1970s, after playing the Empress Frederick in the BBC television drama series Fall of Eagles and Louisa Trotter in another BBC drama, The Duchess of Duke Street. In 1980, she played the role of Portia in the BBC Television Shakespeare production of The Merchant of Venice, opposite Warren Mitchell's Shylock.

Jones played Mrs. Dashwood alongside Kate Winslet, Alan Rickman and Emma Thompson in the Academy Award-winning period drama Sense and Sensibility (1995). Her other notable roles include Mrs. Fairfax in Jane Eyre (1997), Lady Queensbury in Wilde (1997), Grace Winslow in The Winslow Boy (1999), Bridget's mother Pam Jones in Bridget Jones's Diary (2001) and Poppy Pomfrey in Harry Potter and the Chamber of Secrets (2002), reprising her role in Harry Potter and the Half-Blood Prince (2009) and Harry Potter and the Deathly Hallows – Part 2 (2011).

From 2007 to 2008, she played Connie James in the BBC1 drama Spooks. She appeared in the Woody Allen film You Will Meet a Tall Dark Stranger in 2010. In 2011, she appeared in the BBC1 series Merlin, as the Cailleach, the gatekeeper to the spirit world. Also in 2011 she appeared in the Bridge Project's version of Richard III as Queen Margaret, alongside Kevin Spacey as Richard III and directed by Sam Mendes, at the Old Vic and subsequently on an international tour.

She received the British Academy Television Award for Best Supporting Actress for her portrayal of Neil Baldwin's mother, Mary, in the 2014 television film Marvellous.

In 2015, Jones played the part of Petunia Howe in the three-part BBC series Capital, based on John Lanchester's novel of the same name.

In the 2018 BBC Radio 4 production of The Importance of Being Earnest Jones played the part of Lady Augusta Bracknell.

Filmography

Film

Television

Video games

Other projects, contributions
When Love Speaks (2002, EMI Classics) – Shakespeare's "Sonnet 50" ("How heavy do I journey on the way")

References

External links
 

 Gemma Jones at Theatricala

1942 births
Living people
20th-century English actresses
21st-century English actresses
Actresses from London
Alumni of RADA
Best Supporting Actress BAFTA Award (television) winners
English film actresses
English people of Welsh descent
English stage actresses
English television actresses
People from Marylebone